Gradient boosting is a machine learning technique used in regression and classification tasks, among others. It gives a prediction model in the form of an ensemble of weak prediction models, which are typically decision trees. When a decision tree is the weak learner, the resulting algorithm is called gradient-boosted trees; it usually outperforms random forest. A gradient-boosted trees model is built in a stage-wise fashion as in other boosting methods, but it generalizes the other methods by allowing optimization of an arbitrary differentiable loss function.

History 
The idea of gradient boosting originated in the observation by Leo Breiman that boosting can be interpreted as an optimization algorithm on a suitable cost function. Explicit regression gradient boosting algorithms were subsequently developed, by Jerome H. Friedman, simultaneously with the more general functional gradient boosting perspective of Llew Mason, Jonathan Baxter, Peter Bartlett and Marcus Frean.
The latter two papers introduced the view of boosting algorithms as iterative functional gradient descent algorithms. That is, algorithms that optimize a cost function over function space by iteratively choosing a function (weak hypothesis) that points in the negative gradient direction. This functional gradient view of boosting has led to the development of boosting algorithms in many areas of machine learning and statistics beyond regression and classification.

Informal introduction 
(This section follows the exposition of gradient boosting by Cheng.)

Like other boosting methods, gradient boosting combines weak "learners" into a single strong learner in an iterative fashion. It is easiest to explain in the least-squares regression setting, where the goal is to "teach" a model  to predict values of the form  by minimizing the mean squared error , where  indexes over some training set of size  of actual values of the output variable :

  the predicted value 
  the observed value 
  the number of samples in 

Now, let us consider a gradient boosting algorithm with  stages. At each stage  of gradient boosting, suppose some imperfect model  (for low , this model may simply return , where the RHS is the mean of ). In order to improve , our algorithm should add some new estimator, . Thus,

or, equivalently,

.

Therefore, gradient boosting will fit  to the residual . As in other boosting variants, each  attempts to correct the errors of its predecessor . A generalization of this idea to loss functions other than squared error, and to classification and ranking problems, follows from the observation that residuals  for a given model are proportional to the negative gradients of the mean squared error (MSE) loss function (with respect to ):

.

So, gradient boosting could be specialized to a gradient descent algorithm, and generalizing it entails "plugging in" a different loss and its gradient.

Algorithm 
In many supervised learning problems there is an output variable  and a vector of input variables , related to each other with some probabilistic distribution. The goal is to find some function  that best approximates the output variable from the values of input variables. This is formalized by introducing some loss function  and minimizing it in expectation:

 .

The gradient boosting method assumes a real-valued . It seeks an approximation  in the form of a weighted sum of  functions  from some class , called base (or weak) learners:

 .

In accordance with the empirical risk minimization principle, the method tries to find an approximation  that minimizes the average value of the loss function on the training set, i.e., minimizes the empirical risk. It does so by starting with a model, consisting of a constant function , and incrementally expands it in a greedy fashion:

,
,

Unfortunately, choosing the best function  at each step for an arbitrary loss function  is a computationally infeasible optimization problem in general. Therefore, we restrict our approach to a simplified version of the problem.

The idea is to apply a steepest descent step to this minimization problem (functional gradient descent).

In fact, the local maximum-descent direction of the loss function is the negative gradient.

Hence, moving a small amount  such that the linear approximation remains valid:

where . For small , this implies that .

To prove the following, consider the objective

Doing a Taylor expansion to first order

. This is the direction of steepest ascent and hence we must move in the opposite (i.e., negative) direction in order to move in the direction of steepest descent.

Furthermore, we can optimize  by finding the  value for which the loss function has a minimum:

where  is the step length, defined as

Note that this approach is a heuristic and therefore doesn't yield an exact solution to the given problem, but rather an approximation.
In pseudocode, the generic gradient boosting method is:

Input: training set  a differentiable loss function  number of iterations .

Algorithm:

 Initialize model with a constant value:
 
 For  = 1 to :
 Compute so-called pseudo-residuals:
 
 Fit a base learner (or weak learner, e.g. tree) closed under scaling  to pseudo-residuals, i.e. train it using the training set .
 Compute multiplier  by solving the following one-dimensional optimization problem:
 
 Update the model:
 
 Output

Gradient tree boosting 
Gradient boosting is typically used with decision trees (especially CARTs) of a fixed size as base learners. For this special case, Friedman proposes a modification to gradient boosting method which improves the quality of fit of each base learner.

Generic gradient boosting at the m-th step would fit a decision tree  to pseudo-residuals. Let  be the number of its leaves. The tree partitions the input space into  disjoint regions  and predicts a constant value in each region.
 
where  is the value predicted in the region .

Then the coefficients  are multiplied by some value , chosen using line search so as to minimize the loss function, and the model is updated as follows:

 

Friedman proposes to modify this algorithm so that it chooses a separate optimal value  for each of the tree's regions, instead of a single  for the whole tree. He calls the modified algorithm "TreeBoost". The coefficients  from the tree-fitting procedure can be then simply discarded and the model update rule becomes:

Size of trees 
, the number of terminal nodes in trees, is the method's parameter which can be adjusted for a data set at hand. It controls the maximum allowed level of interaction between variables in the model. With  (decision stumps), no interaction between variables is allowed. With  the model may include effects of the interaction between up to two variables, and so on.

Regularization 
Fitting the training set too closely can lead to degradation of the model's generalization ability. Several so-called regularization techniques reduce this overfitting effect by constraining the fitting procedure.

One natural regularization parameter is the number of gradient boosting iterations M (i.e. the number of trees in the model when the base learner is a decision tree). Increasing M reduces the error on training set, but setting it too high may lead to overfitting. An optimal value of M is often selected by monitoring prediction error on a separate validation data set. Besides controlling M, several other regularization techniques are used.

Another regularization parameter is the depth of the trees. The higher this value the more likely the model will overfit the training data.

Shrinkage 
An important part of gradient boosting method is regularization by shrinkage which consists in modifying the update rule as follows:

 

where parameter  is called the "learning rate".

Empirically it has been found that using small learning rates (such as ) yields dramatic improvements in models' generalization ability over gradient boosting without shrinking. However, it comes at the price of increasing computational time both during training and querying: lower learning rate requires more iterations.

Stochastic gradient boosting 
Soon after the introduction of gradient boosting, Friedman proposed a minor modification to the algorithm, motivated by Breiman's bootstrap aggregation ("bagging") method. Specifically, he proposed that at each iteration of the algorithm, a base learner should be fit on a subsample of the training set drawn at random without replacement.  Friedman observed a substantial improvement in gradient boosting's accuracy with this modification.

Subsample size is some constant fraction  of the size of the training set. When , the algorithm is deterministic and identical to the one described above. Smaller values of  introduce randomness into the algorithm and help prevent overfitting, acting as a kind of regularization. The algorithm also becomes faster, because regression trees have to be fit to smaller datasets at each iteration. Friedman obtained that  leads to good results for small and moderate sized training sets. Therefore,  is typically set to 0.5, meaning that one half of the training set is used to build each base learner.

Also, like in bagging, subsampling allows one to define an out-of-bag error of the prediction performance improvement by evaluating predictions on those observations which were not used in the building of the next base learner. Out-of-bag estimates help avoid the need for an independent validation dataset, but often underestimate actual performance improvement and the optimal number of iterations.

Number of observations in leaves 
Gradient tree boosting implementations often also use regularization by limiting the minimum number of observations in trees' terminal nodes. It is used in the tree building process by ignoring any splits that lead to nodes containing fewer than this number of training set instances.

Imposing this limit helps to reduce variance in predictions at leaves.

Penalize complexity of tree 
Another useful regularization techniques for gradient boosted trees is to penalize model complexity of the learned model. The model complexity can be defined as the proportional number of leaves in the learned trees. The joint optimization of loss and model complexity corresponds to a post-pruning algorithm to remove branches that fail to reduce the loss by a threshold. Other kinds of regularization such as an  penalty on the leaf values can also be added to avoid overfitting.

Usage 
Gradient boosting can be used in the field of learning to rank. The commercial web search engines Yahoo and Yandex use variants of gradient boosting in their machine-learned ranking engines. Gradient boosting is also utilized in High Energy Physics in data analysis. At the Large Hadron Collider (LHC), variants of gradient boosting Deep Neural Networks (DNN) were successful in reproducing the results of non-machine learning methods of analysis on datasets used to discover the Higgs boson. Gradient boosting decision tree was also applied in earth and geological studies – for example quality evaluation of sandstone reservoir.

Names 
The method goes by a variety of names. Friedman introduced his regression technique as a "Gradient Boosting Machine" (GBM). Mason, Baxter et al. described the generalized abstract class of algorithms as "functional gradient boosting". Friedman et al. describe an advancement of  gradient boosted models as Multiple Additive Regression Trees (MART); Elith et al. describe that approach as "Boosted Regression Trees" (BRT).

A popular open-source implementation for R calls it a "Generalized Boosting Model", however packages expanding this work use BRT. Yet another name is TreeNet, after an early commercial implementation from Salford System's Dan Steinberg, one of researchers who pioneered the use of tree-based methods. XGBoost is another popular modern implementation of the method with some extensions, like second-order optimization.

Disadvantages 
While boosting can increase the accuracy of a base learner, such as a decision tree or linear regression, it sacrifices intelligibility and interpretability. For example, following the path that a decision tree takes to make its decision is trivial and self-explained, but following the paths of hundreds or thousands of trees is much harder. To achieve both performance and interpretability, some model compression techniques allow transforming an XGBoost into a single "born-again" decision tree that approximates the same decision function. Furthermore, its implementation may be more difficult due to the higher computational demand.

See also 
 AdaBoost
 Random forest
 Catboost
 LightGBM
 XGBoost
 Decision tree learning

References

Further reading

External links
 How to explain gradient boosting
 Gradient Boosted Regression Trees
 LightGBM

Classification algorithms
Decision trees
Ensemble learning